You Can't Stop Love may refer:

Music
 "You Can't Stop Love" (S-K-O song), 1986 song by S-K-O
 "You Can't Stop Love" (Marty Stuart song), 1996 song by Marty Stuart